Mattie Liptak (born April 10, 1996) is an American actor best known for his role as George in the horror film, Quarantine 2: Terminal, a sequel to the 2008 film, Quarantine.

Personal life 
Mattie Liptak was born and raised in Walker, Louisiana to Brenda Tedder and Robert Liptak. He graduated from Walker High School in May 2014.

Filmography

Television

References

External links
 

1996 births
American male child actors
Living people
People from Walker, Louisiana